The Jefferson County School District is a public school district headquartered in Fayette, Mississippi (USA).

The district's boundaries parallel that of Jefferson County.

Governance
The headquarters are in the Robert L. Williams Educational Administration Building in Fayette.

Schools
Jefferson County High School
Jefferson County Junior High School
Jefferson County Upper Elementary  School
Jefferson County Elementary School

Demographics

2006-07 school year
There were a total of 1,473 students enrolled in the Jefferson County School District during the 2006–2007 school year. The gender makeup of the district was 49% female and 51% male. The racial makeup of the district was 99.80% African American and 0.20% Asian. All of the district's students were eligible to receive free lunch.

Previous school years

Accountability statistics

See also

List of school districts in Mississippi

References

External links
 

Education in Jefferson County, Mississippi
School districts in Mississippi